MacLaren or Maclaren is a surname of Scottish origin. The name is an Anglicisation of the Gaelic Mac Labhrainn meaning "son of Labhrann". The Gaelic personal name Labhrann is a Gaelicised form of Lawrence.

People with the surname MacLaren
Alexander Maclaren (1826–1910), Scottish-English non-conformist minister
Alexander Ferguson MacLaren (1854–1917), Canadian manufacturer, exporter and politician
Andrew MacLaren (1883–1975), British politician
Archibald MacLaren (1820–1884), gymnast, fencing master and author 
Archie MacLaren (1871–1944), English cricketer
Charles Maclaren (1782–1866), Scottish journalist and geologist
David Laurence MacLaren (1893–1960), Canadian politician, Lieutenant Governor of New Brunswick
Dave MacLaren (born 1934), Scottish retired football player and manager
Donald MacLaren (1893–1988), Canadian World War I flying ace
Emma Maclaren (born 1991), British model
Fawna MacLaren (born 1965), American model and actress
Geoffrey MacLaren (1883–1966), English cricketer
Ian Maclaren (pseudonym of Rev. John Watson, 1850–1907), Scottish author and theologian
Jack MacLaren, Canadian politician
James MacLaren (disambiguation)
Jamie Maclaren (born 1993), Australian footballer
Jim MacLaren (1963–2010), American motivational speaker and author
Jimmy MacLaren (1921–2004), English footballer
Julian MacLaren-Ross (1912–1964), British novelist
Leon MacLaren (1910–1994), British barrister, politician and philosopher
Lynn MacLaren (born 1962), Australian politician
Mary MacLaren (1896–1985), American film actress
Michelle MacLaren, Canadian television director and producer
Murray MacLaren (1861–1942), Canadian politician, Lieutenant Governor of New Brunswick
Owen Finlay Maclaren (1907–1978), English design engineer
Rachael McLaren, Canadian dancer
Ross MacLaren (born 1962), British former football player and coach
Roy MacLaren (footballer) (born 1930), Scottish footballer
Roy MacLaren (politician) (born 1934), Canadian politician
Sarah F. Maclaren (born 1964), Anglo-Italian cultural theorist, sociologist and anthropologist
Stewart MacLaren (born 1953), Scottish former footballer
Thomas MacLaren (architect) (1863–1928), Scottish architect
William MacLaren (1844–?), English rugby union international
William Scott Maclaren (1845–1909), political figure in Quebec
William de Bois Maclaren (1856–1921), Scottish publisher, businessman and Scout Commissioner

See also
McLaren (surname)

References

Anglicised Scottish Gaelic-language surnames
Clan MacLaren